Bitter Sweet is a British musical romance film directed by Herbert Wilcox and released by United Artists in 1933. It was the first film adaptation of Noël Coward's 1929 operetta Bitter Sweet. It starred Anna Neagle and Fernand Gravey, with Ivy St. Helier reviving her stage role as Manon. It was made at British and Dominion's Elstree Studios and was part of a boom in operetta films during the 1930s.

It tells the story of Sarah Linden's romance. Sarah, now a gray-haired old woman, tells her story to a girl who is on the eve of marrying an obnoxious man when she is really in love with a musician.

The operetta was remade in 1940 as a film of the same name with Jeanette MacDonald and Nelson Eddy; however, it was less faithful to the original story than the less censored 1933 version.

Plot summary

Cast 
 Anna Neagle as Sarah Millick / Sari Linden
 Fernand Gravey as Carl Linden
 Miles Mander as Captain Auguste Lutte
 Clifford Heatherley as Herr Schlick
 Esme Percy as Hugh Devon
 Ivy St. Helier as Manon la Crevette
 Gibb McLaughlin as The Footman
 Stuart Robertson as Lieutenant Tranisch
 Hugh Williams as Vincent
 Pat Paterson as Dolly
 Patrick Ludlow as Henry
 Kay Hammond as Gussi
 Miles Malleson as The Butler
 Norma Whalley as Mrs. Millick
 Al Bowlly as Singer
 Nat Gonella as Trumpeter
 Alan Napier as Lord Shayne
 Lew Stone as Bandleader
 Michael Wilding as Extra

Reception 
According to Wilcox the film made no profits. He later wrote "it must have been my fault, for surely a better musical play has never been written... perhaps, however, the story is rather too sad for a film."

References

External links 
 
 
 
 

1933 films
1930s romantic musical films
British romantic musical films
1930s English-language films
Films directed by Herbert Wilcox
British black-and-white films
United Artists films
Operetta films
Films based on operettas
Films set in Vienna
Films set in the 19th century
British and Dominions Studios films
Films shot at Imperial Studios, Elstree
1930s British films